Aslonnes is a commune in the Vienne department in the Nouvelle-Aquitaine region in western France.

Geography
The Clouère forms part of the commune's south-western border, then flows into the Clain, which forms its western border.

See also
Communes of the Vienne department

References

Communes of Vienne